Prolok was a copy protection system developed by W. Krag Brotby and Vault Corporation in 1982. Prolok was involved in the copyright law case Vault Corp. v. Quaid Software Ltd. which allowed software to be used in certain situations that the copyright holder did not originally intend. 

Prolok was developed for Apple II, CP/M, CP/M-86, MS-DOS, Microsoft Windows and OS/2. US Patent 4,785,361

References

Copy protection
1982 software